Viktor Nikolayevich Zemchenkov (born 15 September 1986) is a Russian former footballer.

Club career
He made his Russian Premier League debut for FC Terek Grozny on 14 March 2008 in a game against PFC Krylia Sovetov Samara.

External links
  Player page on the official FC Terek Grozny website
 

1986 births
Footballers from Moscow
Living people
Russian footballers
FC Kuban Krasnodar players
FC Torpedo Moscow players
FC Akhmat Grozny players
Russian Premier League players
FC Baltika Kaliningrad players
FC Tyumen players
FC Khimki players
FC Chernomorets Novorossiysk players
FC Nizhny Novgorod (2007) players
FC Luch Vladivostok players
FC Solyaris Moscow players
Association football forwards
FC Moscow players
FC Ararat Moscow players